SKM is a passenger transport service in Tricity, Poland and surroundings.
Stops are located as follows:

Gdańsk - Wejherowo (Lębork) line

Gdańsk
Gdańsk Śródmieście
Gdańsk Główny
Gdańsk Stocznia
Gdańsk Politechnika
Gdańsk Wrzeszcz
Gdańsk Zaspa
Gdańsk Przymorze-Uniwersytet
Gdańsk Oliwa
Gdańsk Żabianka AWFiS

Sopot
Sopot Wyścigi
Sopot
Sopot Kamienny Potok

Gdynia
Gdynia Orłowo
Gdynia Redłowo
Gdynia Wzgórze św. Maksymiliana
Gdynia Główna
Gdynia Stocznia
Gdynia Grabówek
Gdynia Leszczynki
Gdynia Chylonia
Gdynia Cisowa

Rumia
Rumia Janowo
Rumia

Reda
Reda
Reda Pieleszewo

Wejherowo
Wejherowo Śmiechowo
Wejherowo Nanice
Wejherowo

Gościcino
Gościcino Wejherowskie

Luzino
Luzino

Strzebielino
Strzebielino Morskie

Bożepole Wielkie
Bożepole Wielkie

Godętowo
Godętowo

Lębork
Lębork Mosty
Lębork

Gdańsk - Nowy Port line
Gdańsk Główny
Gdańsk Stocznia
Gdańsk Nowe Szkoty
Gdańsk Kolonia
Gdańsk Zaspa Towarowa
Gdańsk Brzeźno
Gdańsk Nowy Port 

 
SKM stops